"You're Gorgeous" is a song by British musical project Babybird, released as a commercial single on 30 September 1996. Babybird member Stephen Jones wrote the song and co-produced it with Steve Power. It was their only top-10 hit on the UK Singles Chart, peaking at number three, and reached the top 40 in Australia, Iceland, Ireland, Italy, New Zealand and Sweden. It is the track for which the band is best known.

Lyrical meaning
The song's lyrics are interpreted to describe the way a photographer exploits his models. The track is often mistaken as a love song due to the way it is initially presented, with one person complimenting the other until it is revealed that the narrator is a female model speaking to the photographer.

Critical reception
Stephen Thomas Erlewine from Allmusic (who gave the Ugly Beautiful album 4.5 stars out of 5) praised "You're Gorgeous" as a "effortlessly catchy" pop single, which "positively radiates with twisted sexuality". A reviewer from Music Week rated it four out of five, adding, "Filling the void between Vic Reeves and Bono, Stephen Jones's rich baritone is a svelte joy on this rather flimsy tale of tank tops and snapshots."

Track listings
All songs were written by Stephen Jones.

UK CD1
 "You're Gorgeous"
 "You're Gorgeous Too"
 "Hing King Blues"
 "KW Jesus TV Roof Appeal"

UK CD2
 "You're Gorgeous"
 "Bébé Limonade"
 "Ooh Yeah"
 "Carcrash"

UK 7-inch gold vinyl single
A1. "You're Gorgeous"
B1. "You're Gorgeous Too"
B2. "Bébé Limonade"

UK cassette single
A1. "You're Gorgeous"
A2. "You're Gorgeous Too"
B1. "You're Gorgeous"
B2. "Bébé Limonade"

European and Australian CD single
 "You're Gorgeous"
 "Bébé Limonade" (featuring Olivia Trench)
 "You're Gorgeous Too"
 "Carcrash"

Charts and certifications

Weekly charts

Year-end charts

Certifications

Release history

References

1996 singles
1996 songs
Atlantic Records singles
Babybird songs
The Echo Label singles
Song recordings produced by Steve Power
Songs written by Stephen Jones (Babybird)